Liudas Rumbutis (born 24 November 1955) is a Lithuanian–Belarusian professional football coach and a former player. After spending his youth and early senior football career years in Lithuania, he moved to Belarus in 1975, and stayed there for his almost entire playing and coaching career. He won the Soviet champions title in 1982 with Dinamo Minsk.

During 2017–2018 he was a head coach of Belarus national under-21 football team.

Honours
Dinamo Minsk
Soviet Top League champion: 1982

References

External links
 

1955 births
Living people
Soviet footballers
Lithuanian footballers
Belarusian footballers
Belarusian people of Lithuanian descent
Association football midfielders
Soviet Top League players
FC Smena Minsk players
FK Žalgiris players
Belarusian football managers
Lithuanian football managers
FC Belshina Bobruisk managers
FC Darida Minsk Raion managers
FC Dynamo Brest managers
FC Dinamo Minsk players
FC Dinamo-93 Minsk managers
FC Molodechno managers
FC Neman Grodno managers
FC Partizan Minsk managers